Mary Lou Parks (July 24, 1939August 23, 2015) was a Michigan politician.

Early life
Parks was born on July 24, 1939 in Anderson, South Carolina.

Education
Parks attended Wayne State University.

Career
Parks was executive assistant to U.S. Congressman George Crockett Jr. from 1975 to 1983. Parks was the special assistant Michigan Governor James Blanchard from 1983 to 1990. State representative Joseph F. Young Sr. died on April 9, 1993, sparking a special election to fill his vacancy. On June 29, 1993, Parks won this special election. She was elected to the Michigan House of Representatives where she represented the 3rd district from July 1, 1993 to 1998. Parks ran in the 1998 Michigan Secretary of State election, but was defeated by Candice Miller. Parks was a delegate to the Democratic National Convention from Michigan in 1976, 1980, and 1988. Parks was an alternate delegate to Democratic National Convention in 1984 and 2004.

Personal life
Parks was divorced and had five children. Parks was a member of the NAACP.

Death
Ferguson died on August 23, 2015.

References

1939 births
2015 deaths
People from Anderson, South Carolina
Wayne State University alumni
Women state legislators in Michigan
African-American women in politics
African-American state legislators in Michigan
Democratic Party members of the Michigan House of Representatives
20th-century African-American women
20th-century African-American politicians
21st-century African-American women
21st-century African-American people
20th-century American women politicians
20th-century American politicians